The McKnight District is a predominantly residential neighborhood northeast of downtown Springfield, Massachusetts.  The area represents a planned residential development covering several hundred acres, which was built in the mid to late 19th century.  The architects of the development were John and William McKnight, who, in addition to developing and enforcing construction guidelines in the area, built and landscaped many of the properties.  The area was largely built by 1910, and there has been little new construction in the area since.  Most of the houses built in the area were constructed in most of the architectural styles that were popular between 1880 and 1990, although there is a predominance of the Queen Anne style.  The McKnights began to develop the area, which had previously been mainly farmland, in 1870 with the purchase of a  parcel on which they and a partner built their own homes.  They proceeded over the following years to acquire additional parcels of land in the area, plat out roads, and either build houses themselves, or sell plots to other builders.  They enforced some uniformity in the area through the use of deed restrictions, which required uniform setback requirements, banned fencing, and required a minimum cost of construction (the latter to prevent the building of inexpensive tenement-style housing).

The neighborhood is roughly defined by the railroad tracks on the north and the Bay Street to the south. On the west it is roughly bounded by Armory and Magazine Streets, and on the east by Monmouth, Clifford, Bay, and Marion Streets.

See also
National Register of Historic Places listings in Springfield, Massachusetts
National Register of Historic Places listings in Hampden County, Massachusetts

References

Historic districts in Hampden County, Massachusetts
National Register of Historic Places in Springfield, Massachusetts
Springfield, Massachusetts
Historic districts on the National Register of Historic Places in Massachusetts